Blaine Marchand (born 1949 in Ottawa, Ontario) is a Canadian writer. Marchand has published poetry, non-fiction and a novel.

A longtime program manager with the Canadian International Development Agency, some of his writing has been inspired by his international travels with the organization. In 2012 he was guest editor of an issue of the Canadian poetry magazine Vallum dedicated to poets from Pakistan.

From 1992 to 1994 he was president of the League of Canadian Poets. He was also a co-founder of the Ottawa Independent Writers, the Ottawa Valley Book Festival and the Canadian Review, and a regular columnist for Ottawa's LGBT newspaper Capital Xtra!.

Openly gay, he lives in Ottawa.

Awards
 1971 - Georgia May Cook Sonnet Award
 1987 - Anthos Poetry Prize
 1990 - The League of Canadian Poets National Poetry Contest, second prize
 1992 - Archibald Lampman Award

Publications

Poetry

Novels

Non-fiction

Anthologies

Capital Poets: An Ottawa Anthology. (Ouroboros, 1989).

References

External links
Blaine Marchand at the League of Canadian Poets

1949 births
Living people
20th-century Canadian poets
Canadian male poets
Canadian male novelists
Canadian non-fiction writers
Canadian gay writers
Writers from Ottawa
Canadian columnists
Canadian LGBT poets
Canadian LGBT novelists
20th-century Canadian male writers
Canadian male non-fiction writers
21st-century Canadian LGBT people
Gay poets
Gay novelists